The following highways are numbered 294:

Japan
 Japan National Route 294

United States
  Interstate 294
  Arkansas Highway 294
  Florida State Road 294
  Georgia State Route 294 (former)
  Iowa Highway 294 (former)
  Kentucky Route 294
  M-294 (Michigan Highway)
  Minnesota State Highway 294 (former)
  Montana Secondary Highway 294
  Nevada State Route 294
  New Mexico State Road 294
 New York:
  New York State Route 294
  County Route 294 (Erie County, New York)
  North Carolina Highway 294
  North Dakota Highway 294
  Ohio State Route 294
  Pennsylvania Route 294
  Tennessee State Route 294
 Texas:
  Texas State Highway 294
  Texas State Highway Spur 294
  Farm to Market Road 294
  Utah State Route 294
  Virginia State Route 294
  Washington State Route 294 (former)
  Wyoming Highway 294